The 1948 Easter Crisis was the fear that the Soviet Union or Soviet-aligned Communists were planning an invasion or coup d'état in Denmark, in the wake of the 1948 Communist Coup in Czechoslovakia. Until this crisis, Denmark had tried to remain neutral between East and West, but in the election of 1947, the Communists had been reduced from 18 to 9 seats in the Folketing, removing them from participation in the parliamentary defence and security committee. It was now possible for defence to be discussed without any Communist intervention. Growing fear of attack from the East caused Denmark's government led by Hans Hedtoft to align with the West. After an abortive attempt to form a Scandinavian defence union with Finland, Iceland, Norway and Sweden, Denmark joined NATO in 1949.

References
 Påskekrisen 1948 Danmark i den kolde krig

Easter Crisis
Easter Crisis
Political history of Denmark
Anti-communism
Communism in Denmark